The 1969 Pacific Conference Games was the first edition of the international athletics competition between five Pacific coast nations: Australia, Canada, Japan, New Zealand and the United States. It was held from 26–27 September at the National Olympic Stadium in Tokyo, Japan. A total of 20 men's and 12 women's athletics events were contested.

Medal summary

Men

Women

References

Medalists
Pacific Conference Games. GBR Athletics. Retrieved on 2015-01-14.
Australia at the Games Pacific Conference Games - 1969 Tokyo, Japan . Athletics Australia. Retrieved on 2015-01-15.

1969 in athletics (track and field)
Pacific Conference Games
Pacific Conference Games
Pacific Conference Games
International athletics competitions hosted by Japan
Pacific Conference Games